The flag of Tbilisi, capital of Georgia, is a rectangular white banner with a blue Nordic-type cross outlined in amber that extends to edges of the flag. The point of crossing is crowned by the central detail from the Seal of Tbilisi surrounded by seven-point gold stars lined up in a crescent manner.

References 

Government of Tbilisi
Tbilisi
Tbilisi
Tbilisi